Antonio Tamburini (born 15 September 1966) is a former Italian racing driver. He has competed in various single-seater and touring car championships before retiring in 1998. He tested Formula One car for AGS in 1991, as well as raced for Andrea Moda Formula in non-championship Formula One Indoor Trophy the same year.

Racing career

Complete International Formula 3000 results
(key) (Races in bold indicate pole position) (Races
in italics indicate fastest lap)

Complete Italian Touring Car Championship results

References

External links

 Profile on Driver Database
 Profile on Speedsport Magazine

1966 births
Living people
Italian racing drivers
International Formula 3000 drivers
Italian Formula Three Championship drivers
Prema Powerteam drivers